The Marcílio Dias-class destroyers (sometimes referred to as M class) were three destroyers of the Brazilian Navy that served during World War II. They were based on the United States Navy's . They entered service in 1943 and served on Atlantic convoy duty with the Allies. In July 1944, the three destroyers escorted the Brazilian Expeditionary Force to Italy. Following the end of the war, the destroyers remained in service, undergoing modernisation. Two were discarded in 1966, with the last taken out of service in 1973.

Design and description
The Marcílio Dias class was based on the United States' , built within Brazil.

The destroyers were powered by four Babcock & Wilcox Express boilers supplying steam to General Electric Company geared turbines that drove two shafts. The destroyers had a complement of 190 officers and ratings.

The planned armament of the class was to be five /38 calibre guns mounted in single turrets. This was augmented with four 40 mm guns and four 20 mm guns for anti-aircraft defence. They were also to be equipped with two quadruple  torpedo tube mounts. However, while under construction, one of the 5-inch guns and one of the quad mounts of torpedo tubes were removed and the number of 20 mm guns was increased to eight. Only the forward 5-inch gun was given a gun shield. For anti-submarine warfare, the destroyers were given two depth charge racks, four depth charge throwers and equipped with sonar.

In 1966 a Sea Cat missile system was fitted to Mariz e Barros, with the destroyer used as a test platform.

Ships of the class

Service history
The Marcílio Dias were the first warships constructed in Brazil of any size, and due to this fact, took a long time to build. After commissioning, all three vessels were assigned to Naval Forces North-East patrolling the South Atlantic. Each patrol lasted roughly fourteen days and were used primarily to intercept Axis blockade runners. The patrols sometimes worked in concert with United States Navy forces. The destroyers also saw convoy escort duty between Rio de Janeiro, Recife and Trinidad and in July 1944, escorted the five convoys that carried the Brazilian Expeditionary Force to Italy.

Citations

Sources
 
 
 

 

Destroyer classes
 
World War II destroyers of Brazil